Amb. Mohamud Ali Saleh is a former Kenyan Ambassador to Kingdom of Saudi Arabia, he was appointed the Regional Commissioner for North Eastern Region (Kenya) in May 2015 after the Garissa University attack which killed 148 students.

Amb. Saleh was given the sole aim of fighting Al-shabab, upon his appointment the terror attack in Nep Region has drastically gone down. As P.C. he is credited with eliminating the shifta menace in the early 2000s. He was appointed as the RC, North Eastern Region to deal with the Al-Shabaab following the massacre of 148 people mostly students at Garissa university on April 2, 2015.

He is responsible for coordinating and overseeing security and peace initiatives in the region. He has a good working relationship with leaders especially those elected from the region.

A team of security officers drawn from the National Intelligence Service, the Kenya Police and Administration Police are directly under the command of Mr Saleh.

Life and career
He is a long serving administrator, many see Saleh as a man of high integrity. Others say he is authoritative and firm—a phrase which has earned him friends and foes on equal measure. He is influential and an opinion shaper in his region of northeastern Kenya where instability and insecurity is rife.

NEP Residents hail him as a performer and impartial. Since the appointment of Ambassador Saleh peace and stability has been seen in the North Eastern Region of Kenya where it was hard hit with terrorism. He was recently awarded by the President of Republic of Kenya H.E. Uhuru Kenyatta the award of The First Class: Chief of the Order of the Burning Spear (CBS) for relentless service he rendered to NEP and the Republic of Kenya in different capacities.

References

Kenyan civil servants
Living people
Year of birth missing (living people)